Rainald of Urslingen was the son of Conrad of Urslingen and Duke of Spoleto from 1223 to 1230.

Rainald was initially appointed by the Papacy to oppose Dipold, Count of Acerra, and in 1228 he was granted sweeping powers, which he did not hesitate to use, as imperial vicar in the March of Ancona. In that year, he invaded the March and granted privileges to Osimo, San Ginesio, Ripatransone, and Recanati. This action sparked the War of the Keys.

Sources
Jordan, E. Les origines de la domination Angevine en Italie. Paris, 1909.

Dukes of Spoleto
Court of Frederick II, Holy Roman Emperor
12th-century births
1230 deaths
Year of birth unknown